Yury Astapenka (born 10 October 1990) is a Belarusian cross-country skier.

He represented Belarus at the FIS Nordic World Ski Championships 2015 in Falun.

References

External links 
 

1990 births
Living people
Belarusian male cross-country skiers
Cross-country skiers at the 2018 Winter Olympics
Olympic cross-country skiers of Belarus